Olney station may refer to:

 Olney railway station (England), a former railway station in Olney, Buckinghamshire, England
 Olney station (SEPTA Regional Rail), a SEPTA Regional Rail station in Philadelphia, Pennsylvania, USA
 Olney Transportation Center, a SEPTA subway and bus station in Philadelphia, Pennsylvania, USA

See also
Olney (disambiguation)